Authentic TV was a short-lived television home shopping channel in the United Kingdom. It began broadcasting on Sky Digital on 21 January 2005 and ceased broadcasting on 1 September 2005.

Channel History
Authentic TV was the brainchild of Collectibles Guru, Gary Ashburn a leading Collectibles expert who had successfully appeared for many years on QVC and Ideal World TV Home Shopping Channels in the UK. It was conceived by Gary and long-term partner; Paul Lavers as a channel where people could purchase exclusive collectibles, memorabilia and limited editions. Examples of the products on offer included Sports Memorabilia, Rock 'n' Roll Music, Film and TV Memorabilia. The launch team presenters included shopping TV veteran Chloe Marshall and Nikki Vincent.

Without having its own studios, post-production suites, call centres and offices, Authentic TV operated as a kind of virtual channel - even the Sky EPG and Ofcom licence were leased from another channel service provider. Conceptually, creatively and commercially the project seemed attractive but was doomed to failure as Authentic TV became a victim of Sky EPG's over-crowded shopping listings and was listed in a section separate from all other shopping channels. It also underestimated the "stack-em high" sell it cheap philosophy of traditional direct response marketing. A good idea and solid production value that due to factors outside of their control failed to reach its potential.

Shopping networks in the United Kingdom
Defunct television channels in the United Kingdom
Television channels and stations established in 2004
Television channels and stations disestablished in 2005